Francis Healy or Frances Healy or variants thereof may refer to:

Francis Healy (baseball) (1910–1997), American baseball player
Frances Healy (born 1970), Irish actress and presenter
Frances Healy (archaeologist), British archaeologist and prehistorian
Fran Healy (baseball) (born 1946), Francis Healy, former baseball player and former television announcer for the New York Mets
Fran Healy (musician) (born 1973), Francis Healy, lead singer and songwriter of the band Travis
Frank Healy (born 1962), Francis Healy, bass guitarist

See also
Healy (surname)
Healey (surname)